The Novantae were a people of the late 2nd century who lived in what is now Galloway and Carrick, in southwesternmost Scotland. They are mentioned briefly in Ptolemy's Geography (written c. 150), and there is no other historical record of them.
Excavations at Rispain Camp, near Whithorn, show that it was a large fortified farmstead occupied between 100 BC and 200 AD, indicating that the people living in the area at that time were engaged in agriculture.

Their ethnic and cultural affinity is uncertain, with various authorities positing different links, beginning with Bede, who referred to the Novantae as the Niduarian Picts, and including the Encyclopædia Britannica (11th ed.), which described them as "a tribe of Celtic Gaels called Novantae or Atecott Picts." Scottish author Edward Grant Ries has identified the Novantae (along with other early tribes of southern Scotland) as a Brythonic-speaking culture. However, the region has a history that includes the culture of the Gaels, Picts, and Brythonic speakers at various times, alone and in combination, and there is not enough information to make conclusions about the ethnicity of the Novantae.

Ptolemy

The only reliable historical reference to the Novantae is from the Geography of Ptolemy in c. 150, where he gives their homeland and primary towns. They are found in no other source.

They are unique among the peoples that Ptolemy names in that their location is reliably known due to the way he named several readily identifiable physical features. His Novantarum Cheronesus is the Rhins of Galloway, and his Novantarum promontory is Corsewall Point or the Mull of Galloway. This pins the Novantae to that area. Ptolemy says that their towns were Locopibium and Rerigonium. As there were no towns as such in the area at that time, he was likely referring to native strong points such as duns or royal courts.

Roman era
The earliest reliable information on the region of Galloway and Carrick when it was inhabited by the Novantae comes from archaeological discoveries. They lived in small enclosed settlements, most of them less than a single hectare in area and inhabited from the 1st millennium BC through to the Roman era. They also constructed hillforts and a small number of crannogs and brochs. Stone-walled huts appear during the Roman era and the Novantae are thought to have had a centre of some kind at Clatteringshaws near Kirkcudbright, which started out as a palisaded enclosure before being expanded into a set of timber and then stone-faced ramparts. This had been abandoned by the Roman period but there is evidence that the Romans used it as the target of a military exercise, erecting two practice camps nearby and subjecting it to a mock siege.

The only Roman military presence was a small fortlet at Gatehouse of Fleet, in the southeastern part of Novantae territory. The Roman remains that have been excavated are portable, such as might be carried or transported into the region. The absence of evidence of Roman presence is in sharp contrast to the many remains of native habitation and strong points. Rispain Camp near Whithorn, once thought to be Roman, is now known to be the remains of a large fortified farmstead, occupied by natives before and during the Roman Era.

In his account of the campaigns of Gnaeus Julius Agricola (governor 78 – 84), Tacitus offers no specific information on the peoples then living in Scotland. He says that after a combination of force and diplomacy quieted discontent among the Britons who had been conquered previously, Agricola built forts in their territories in 79. In 80 he marched to the Firth of Tay, campaigning against the peoples there. He did not return until 81, at which time he consolidated his gains in the lands that he had conquered. The Novantae were later said to have caused trouble along Hadrian's Wall, and the Gatehouse of Fleet fortlet was presumably used to subdue them.

Novant
The Novantae disappear from the historical record after the end of the Roman occupation, as the name was beyond doubt the Roman name for the people who did not use it, with their territory supplanted by the kingdoms of Rheged and Gododdin. A kingdom called Novant appears in the medieval Welsh poem Y Gododdin, attributed to Aneirin. The poem commemorates the Battle of Catraeth, in which an army raised by Gododdin attempted an ill-fated raid on the Angles of Bernicia. The work elegises the various warriors who fought alongside the Gododdin, among them the "Three Chiefs of Novant" and their substantial retinue. This Novant is evidently related to the Novantae tribe of the Iron Age.

Contradicting Ptolemy 

Ptolemy's placement of the Selgovae town of Trimontium was accepted to be somewhere along the southern coast of Scotland until William Roy (1726–1790) placed it far to the east at Eildon Hills, near Newstead. Roy was trying to follow an itinerary given in the 1757 De Situ Britanniae, and moving Ptolemy's Trimontium made the itinerary seem more logical according to his historical work, Military Antiquities of the Romans in North Britain (1790, published posthumously in 1793). Roy did not alter Ptolemy's placement of the Selgovae in southern Scotland, but chose to assign Trimontium to a different people who were described in De Situ Britanniae.

When De Situ Britanniae was debunked as a fraud in 1845, Roy's misguided placement of Trimontium was retained by some historians, though he was no longer cited for his contribution. Furthermore, some historians not only accepted Roy's placement of Trimontium, but also returned the town to the Selgovae by moving their territory such that they would be near Eildon Hills. Ptolemy's placement of the Novantae in Galloway was retained, and since Ptolemy said that they were adjacent to the Selgovae, Novantae territory was greatly expanded beyond Galloway to be consistent with this thesis, which survives in a number of modern histories.

The result is that an 'error correction' to the sole legitimate historical reference (Ptolemy), made so that a fictional itinerary in De Situ Britanniae would seem more logical, is retained; and the sole legitimate historical reference is further 'corrected' by moving the Selgovae far from their only known location, greatly expanding Novantae territory in the process.

While Roy's historical work is largely ignored due to his unknowing reliance on a fraudulent source, his maps and drawings are untainted, and continue to be held in the highest regard.

Treatment by historians
Befitting the single historical mention of the Novantae by Ptolemy, many historians have largely included the Novantae im passim in their works, if they are mentioned at all. William Forbes Skene (Celtic Scotland, 1886) briefly relates their notice in Ptolemy, adding his conjectures as to the possible locations of towns, though not with any conviction. John Rhys (Celtic Britain, 1904) mentions the Novantae in passing, without any detailed discussion. Local Galwegian historians, writing histories of their own home territory, provide a similarly scant treatment.

More recent histories largely treat the Novantae in passing, but often weave them into a story that is not supported by either Ptolemy's map or archaeological evidence. John Koch (Celtic Culture, 2005) doesn't discuss the Novantae directly, but associates their name with the Trinovantes of southeastern England, and provides a map showing the "Novant" occupying Galloway and the Stewartry of Kirkcudbright to accompany his discussion of the Gododdin. Barry Cunliffe, an archaeologist, (Iron Age Communities in Britain, 1971) mentions the Novantae in passing, saying their homeland was Galloway and the Stewartry of Kirkcudbright, and with a map showing it, which he attributes to "various sources". David Mattingly (An Imperial Possession: Britain in the Roman Empire, 2006) mentions them as a people of southwestern Scotland according to Ptolemy, with maps showing them as occupying both Galloway and the Stewartry of Kirkcudbright. Sheppard Frere (Britannia: A History of Roman Britain, 1987) mentions the Novantae several times in passing, associating them firmly with the Selgovae and sometimes with the Brigantes. He places them in both Galloway and the Stewartry of Kirkcudbright, with the Selgovae on the other side of the Southern Uplands in southeastern Scotland. The Novantae are inconsequential to the larger history of Scotland in Before Scotland: The Story of Scotland Before History (2005) by Alistair Moffat, but he weaves a number of colourful though questionable details about them into his story. He says that their name means 'The Vigorous People', that they had kings and often acted in concert with the Selgovae and Brigantes, all of whom may have joined the Picts in raids on Roman Britain. He provides no authority for any of these assertions.

See also 
 Ptolemy's Geography
 Britannia (Roman province)
 Scotland during the Roman Empire

Citations

References

 

 

 
 
 

Tribes of ancient Scotland
Celtic Britons
Scotland in the Roman era
2nd century in Scotland
Historical Celtic peoples
Tribes mentioned by Ptolemy